Hedvig Söderström (1830–1914) was a Swedish photographer.

She is known as the first woman to open a photographic studio in Stockholm,  in 1857. She was long referred to as the first professional female photographer in Sweden, but this distinction actually belongs to Brita Sofia Hesselius.

References 

1830 births
1914 deaths
19th-century Swedish photographers
Pioneers of photography
Swedish women photographers
19th-century women photographers